Paralomis is a genus of king crabs. It includes the following species:

Paralomis aculeata Henderson, 1888
Paralomis africana Macpherson, 1982
Paralomis alcockiana Hall & Thatje, 2009
Paralomis anamerae Macpherson, 1988
Paralomis arae Macpherson, 2001
Paralomis arethusa Macpherson, 1994
Paralomis aspera Faxon, 1893
Paralomis birsteini Macpherson, 1988
Paralomis bouvieri Hansen, 1908
Paralomis ceres Macpherson, 1989
Paralomis chilensis Andrade, 1980
Paralomis cristata Takeda & Ohta, 1979
Paralomis cristulata Macpherson, 1988
Paralomis cubensis Chace, 1939
Paralomis danida Takeda & Bussarawit, 2007
Paralomis dawsoni Macpherson, 2001
Paralomis debodeorum Feldmann, 1998 †
Paralomis diomedeae (Faxon, 1893)
Paralomis dofleini Balss, 1911
Paralomis echidna Ahyong, 2010
Paralomis elongata Spiridonov, Turkay, Arntz & Thatje, 2006
Paralomis erinacea Macpherson, 1988
Paralomis formosa Henderson, 1888
Paralomis gowlettholmes Ahyong, 2010
Paralomis granulosa (Hombron & Jacquinot, 1846)
Paralomis grossmani Macpherson, 1988
Paralomis haigae Eldredge, 1976
Paralomis hirtella de Saint Laurent & Macpherson, 1997
Paralomis histrix (De Haan, 1849)
Paralomis hystrixoides Sakai, 1980
Paralomis inca Haig, 1974
Paralomis indica Alcock & Anderson, 1899
Paralomis investigatoris Alcock & Anderson, 1899
Paralomis jamsteci Takeda & Hashimoto, 1990
Paralomis japonicus Balss, 1911
Paralomis kyushupalauensis Takeda, 1985
Paralomis longidactylus Birstein & Vinogradov, 1972
Paralomis longipes Faxon, 1893
Paralomis makarovi Hall & Thatje, 2009
Paralomis manningi Williams, Smith & Baco, 2000
Paralomis medipacifica Takeda, 1974
Paralomis mendagnai Macpherson, 2003
Paralomis microps Filhol, 1884
Paralomis multispina (Benedict, 1895)
Paralomis nivosa Hall & Thatje, 2009
Paralomis ochthodes Macpherson, 1988
Paralomis odawarai (Sakai, 1980)
Paralomis otsuae Wilson, 1990
Paralomis pacifica Sakai, 1978
Paralomis papillata (Benedict, 1895)
Paralomis pectinata Macpherson, 1988
Paralomis phrixa Macpherson, 1992
Paralomis poorei Ahyong, 2010
Paralomis roeleveldae Kensley, 1981
Paralomis seagranti Eldredge, 1976
Paralomis serrata Macpherson, 1988
Paralomis spectabilis Hansen, 1908
Paralomis spinosissima Birstein & Vinogradov, 1972
Paralomis staplesi Ahyong, 2010
Paralomis stella Macpherson, 1988
Paralomis stevensi Ahyong & Dawson, 2006
Paralomis taylorae Ahyong, 2010
Paralomis truncatispinosa Takeda & Miyake, 1980
Paralomis tuberipes Macpherson, 1988
Paralomis verrilli (Benedict, 1895)
Paralomis webberi Ahyong, 2010
Paralomis zealandica Dawson & Yaldwyn, 1971

References

Further reading

External links 
 

King crabs
Decapod genera
Taxa named by Adam White (zoologist)